Methiola picta, the red-legged methiola, is a species of short-horned grasshopper in the family Acrididae. It is found in Australia.

Subspecies
These two subspecies belong to the species Methiola picta:
 Methiola picta gemmata Rehn, 1957
 Methiola picta picta Sjöstedt, 1920

References

External links

 

Oxyinae
Taxa named by Bror Yngve Sjöstedt
Taxa described in 1920